Akpınar is a town and district of Kırşehir Province in the Central Anatolia region of Turkey. According to the 2000 census, the population of the district is 13,349, of whom 3,696 live in the town of Akpınar.

History
According to the article by Abdulbaki Uçan, "" Akpınar was founded by the primitive clans of the pre-Hittites. In the environs of Akpınar some artificial mounds support Uçan's assumption. He conducted a surface search in 2011 (Tekhöyük) and after that published an article on the surface ruins of Tekhöyük and İkiztepe Tumulus. In 1986 Tsugio Mikami and Sachihiro Omura were in the vicinity of Akpınar under the aegis of the Japan Middle Eastern Culture Center and found some ruins of the Iron Age and Bronze Age in the surface levels at Akpınar Höyük. Nevertheless there is no comprehensive research about the ancient history of Akpınar except for Uçan's article.

Notes

References
 
 Abdulbaki Uçan, En Eski Çağlardan Günümüze Büyükabdiuşağı Ve Çevresi(n.d.)

External links
 District governor's official website 
 District municipality's official website 
 Akpınar Daily News Site 

Towns in Turkey
Populated places in Kırşehir Province
Districts of Kırşehir Province